The Leckihorn is a mountain in the Lepontine Alps, located on the border between the cantons of Valais and Uri. Its summit is also named Gross Leckihorn (3,068 metres) to distinguish it from a lower summit (3,023 metres) named Chli Leckihorn.

References

External links
Gross Leckihorn on Summitpost
Leckihorn on Hikr

Mountains of the Alps
Alpine three-thousanders
Mountains of Switzerland
Mountains of Valais
Mountains of the canton of Uri
Uri–Valais border
Lepontine Alps